Hannes Huettenbrenner is an Austrian para-alpine skier. He represented Austria in alpine skiing at the 1994 Winter Paralympics.

He won the gold medal in the Men's Downhill LW6/8 event and the bronze medal in the Men's Giant Slalom LW6/8 event.

See also 
 List of Paralympic medalists in alpine skiing

References 

Living people
Year of birth missing (living people)
Place of birth missing (living people)
Paralympic alpine skiers of Austria
Alpine skiers at the 1994 Winter Paralympics
Medalists at the 1994 Winter Paralympics
Paralympic gold medalists for Austria
Paralympic bronze medalists for Austria
Paralympic medalists in alpine skiing
20th-century Austrian people